Ronald Dunn may refer to:

Ron Dunn (born 1950), American baseball player
Ron Dunn (footballer) (1928–2011), Australian rules footballer
Ronald Dunn (sports shooter) (born 1943), Ecuadorian sports shooter
Ronnie Dunn (born 1953), American singer-songwriter
Ronnie Dunn (footballer) (1908–1994), English footballer